Seam was an American indie rock band from Chicago (formerly from Chapel Hill, North Carolina). Active from 1991 to 2000, it was led by Sooyoung Park, former frontman of Bitch Magnet. Seam's  initial line-up included bassist Lexi Mitchell and drummer Mac McCaughan (of Superchunk).

History
The band signed to Homestead Records in the United States and City Slang in Europe, and released debut album Headsparks in 1992, the same year the band relocated to Chicago. In 1993 they left Homestead for Touch and Go Records, releasing the "Kernel" single before McCaughan left to be replaced by Bob Rising, with Craig White also joining on guitar. This line-up recorded the band's second album, The Problem with Me in 1993. The band returned in 1995 with the album Are You Driving Me Crazy?, with Park now joined by a new line-up of Reg Shrader (guitar), William Shin (bass guitar), and Chris Manfrin (drums). The band's final album, The Pace Is Glacial, was released in 1998. Their last tour was in Seoul, South Korea, in 2000.

Drummer Chris Manfrin later played in the band Bottomless Pit, featuring two members from former labelmates Silkworm.

Members
Sooyoung Park – guitar, vocals (1991–2000)
Craig White – guitar (1992–1993)
Reg Shrader – guitar (1993–1998)
John Lee – guitar (1999)
Lexi Mitchell – bass (1991–1994)
William Shin – bass (1994–2000)
Mac McCaughan – drums (1991–1992)
Bob Rising – drums (1992–1993)
Chris Manfrin – drums (1993–2000)

Discography
Studio albums
Headsparks (1992, Homestead)
The Problem with Me (1993, Touch and Go)
Are You Driving Me Crazy? (1995, Touch and Go)
The Pace Is Glacial (1998, Touch and Go)

EPs and singles
"Days of Thunder" (1991, Homestead)
"Granny 9X" (1992, Merge)
Kernel (1993, Touch and Go)
"Hey Latasha" (1995, Ché)
"Sukiyaki" (1999, Ajax)

References

External links
 Band site at tgrec.com
 [ Online history of Seam]

Musical groups from Chapel Hill-Carrboro, North Carolina
Musical groups from Chicago
Indie rock musical groups from North Carolina
Indie rock musical groups from Illinois
Homestead Records artists
Touch and Go Records artists
Musical groups established in 1991
1991 establishments in the United States
Sadcore and slowcore groups